A free party is a party "free" from the restrictions of the legal club scene, similar to the free festival movement. It typically involves a sound system playing electronic dance music from late at night until the time when the organisers decide to go home. A free party can be composed of just one system or of many and if the party becomes a festival, it becomes a teknival. This typically means that drugs are readily available. The word free in this context is used both to describe the entry fee and the lack of restrictions and law enforcement. 

Motivations for organisers range from political protest to simply wanting to have fun. An example of free parties as political protest was their prominence during the M11 link road protest. At most parties no money is asked for entrance since the aim is not to make profit. However, at some (most often indoor) events it is requested at the door to make a donation to cover costs. Typically organisers make little profit or make a loss setting them up. The term free party is used more widely in Europe than in the US. In Canada and some parts of Europe they are also referred to as Freetekno parties. A free party might have once been described as a rave, and the origins of the two are similar. Since the birth of nightclubs in town centres in Europe the use of the word rave had largely fallen out of fashion, however in recent times it is increasingly being used again.

The term squat party defines the free parties with secret indoor locations. The address is obtained on the day of the event personally from organizers as the buildings are squatted. The parties often last over 24 hours.

History

After the emergence of the Acid House parties in the late 1980s up to 4,000 people were known to attend a rave. These events happened almost every weekend. The noise and disturbance of thousands of people appearing at parties in rural locations, such as Genesis '88, caused outrage in the national media. The British government made the fine for holding an illegal party £20,000 and six months in prison.

Police crackdowns on these often-illegal parties drove the scene into the countryside. These weekend parties occurred at various locations outside the M25 Orbital motorway and attracted up to 25 000. Sound systems from this time include Spiral Tribe and DiY.

In the 1990s raves began to expand into a global phenomenon. Around 1989-1992 people who had travelled to attend the first raves began setting up promotion companies in each region to organize their own parties. This happened on a grassroots basis. By the mid-1990s, major corporations were sponsoring events and adopting the scene's music and fashion for their advertising.

After sensational coverage in the tabloids, culminating in a particularly large rave (near Castlemorton) in May 1992, the government acted on what was depicted as a growing menace. In 1994, the United Kingdom's Criminal Justice Bill passed as the Criminal Justice and Public Order Act 1994 which contained several sections designed to suppress the growing free party and anti-road protest movements (sometimes embodied by ravers and travellers).

By the early 2000s, the term "rave" had fallen out of favour among some people in the electronic dance music community, particularly in Europe. Many Europeans identify themselves as "clubbers" rather than ravers. The term 'free party' has been used for sometime and can be seen on the Spiral Tribe video 'Forward the Revolution' in 1992. It tried to disconnect raves from big commercial events of the early nineties to a more anarchist version of a party.

Some communities preferred the term "festival", while others simply referred to "parties". With less constrictive laws allowing raves to continue long after the United Kingdom tried to ban them, more anarchic raves continue to occur in Central Europe and France, where the law says there can be only 4 teknivals per year (2 in the south, 2 in the north). In France the larger teknivals can attract up to 30 000 people in a three-day period. The terms free party and squat party have become the predominant terms used to describe an illegal party.

Free parties tend to be on the boundaries of law and are discouraged by government authorities, occasionally using aggressive police tactics.

Typical party

Free parties are much like other rave parties, their main distinction being that the venue is free to use. The result is that they are often held in isolated outdoor venues or abandoned buildings, where they are also known as squat parties. If the building has a power source that is used but if not then the organisers will use generators.

Often free parties involve a lot of (mostly illegal) dance drug use. The music played at free parties is very bass heavy. It is for this reason that they are usually held in isolated venues or places where police interference is unlikely, such as protected squatting residences (particularly in the UK, where police used not to be able to enter a squat easily).

The types of music played are usually various forms of dance music with fast repetitive beats. Each sound system has its own music policy, following and entourage. The breakcore, gabba, psy-trance, techno, Acid Techno, Hard Trance and Electro House/Techno, Drum & Bass/Jungle, Hardtek, Tekstep genres are all played. Some parties in England, but also across Europe such as in the Netherlands, now incorporate elements of performance art ("synthetic circus") as well as electronic dance music.

Due to the lack of licensing restrictions, these parties often start after midnight and continue through the night until morning, often longer. Parties lasting several days are not uncommon; some large teknivals can go on for a week.

Squat parties have an overt or implied radical left-wing stance.  The squat party community embraces autonomous, anarchistic principles by refusing to recognize the right of any third-party authority to decide when and how people should congregate.  Squat party organizers also eschew capitalistic values by putting on parties which benefit the community and its artists instead of to turn a profit.

Occasionally, squat parties act as ad-hoc information points where political pamphlets are distributed or petitions signed in order to raise awareness about a variety of causes, usually of a left-wing nature.  London's Reclaim the Streets movement, which brought traffic and commerce to a standstill once a year in an attempt to draw public attention to inner city problems, was itself a highly visible and politicized affiliate of the U.K. squat party scene.

Squat parties are occasionally held for the sole purpose of fund-raising, usually for humanitarian causes.

Law and police
Missing laws regulating free parties outside the UK, see Talk:Free party

UK

Under the Criminal Justice and Public Order Act 1994 the definition of music played at a rave was given as:

Sections 63, 64 & 65 of the Act targeted electronic dance music played at raves. The Criminal Justice and Public Order Act empowered police to stop a rave in the open air during any period of time, day or night when a hundred or more people are attending, or where two or more are making preparations for a rave. Section 65 allows any uniformed constable who believes a person is on their way to a rave within a five-mile radius to stop them and direct them away from the area; non-compliant citizens may be subject to a maximum fine not exceeding level 3 on the standard scale (£1000). The Act was ostensibly introduced because of the noise and disruption caused by all night parties to nearby residents, and to protect the countryside. It has also been claimed that it was introduced to kill a popular youth movement that was taking many drinkers out of town centres drinking taxable alcohol and into fields to take untaxed drugs.

The number of people attending and organising such an event for it to be deemed illegal were altered in the Anti-Social Behaviour Act 2003 section 58 to cover indoor parties and outdoor parties of more than 20 people. It is also a crime if, within 24 hours of being told by a police officer to leave a rave, a person makes preparations to attend a rave.

More recently in the United Kingdom, anti-social behaviour orders (ASBOs) have been used against unlicensed rave organisers if the police receive repeated complaints about noise and littering from locals.

Despite these laws, free parties continue to exist. They do so in a number of ways. They can be small (with fewer than 100 people) and remote so that they are unlikely to cause distress to the local residents. If the police find out about the party and turn up, it is rarely worth the use of resources to attempt to arrest people and seize equipment. The people at the rave would then have to leave without having time to tidy up and potentially still incapable of driving safely. The other way free parties continue is to be large enough to make breaking them up difficult. When there are more than 500 or so people then there is a potential for a riot.
A typical police response to why a rave was not stopped is:
"officers had decided not to stop the rave because they had only received one complaint about noise and the amount of resources needed to stop it would not be justified."

In August 2006, an unlicensed party organised by united sounds – Aztek, LowKey, One Love, Mission, Illicit, Monolith & Brains-Kan Sound Systems in Essex, England was broken up after 24 hours resulting in approx 60 injuries from both sides and over 50 arrests. This was one of the largest confrontations between police and ravers that had occurred at an unlicensed event for many years. The Chief Superintendent in charge of the police operation said "These sorts of raves are quite unheard of in this county - I have not seen this sort of violence since the old days of acid house."

Squat party

A squat party is a party that takes place either in a disused building (broken into and secured for the party) or in an already existing squat.

Squat parties are usually advertised either by word of mouth, postings on internet bulletin boards, flyers handed out at other similar events and through phone lines set up by the sound system(s) organising the event. This is for security reasons, since the organisers do not want the authorities finding out about them and trying to stop them. Other events might be much smaller acoustic nights run more like a cafe. Squatted buildings are often used as social centres and creative spaces for people to use.

Most squat parties usually run for 12 to 24 hours, finishing when the organisers have had enough or if they are shut down by police.   Most large cities in the UK have a squat party scene with London considered the most active location in the country. The majority of London squat parties occur in mainly industrial sectors e.g. East London, as abandoned warehouses make ideal venues and a smaller chance of residential noise complaints. The London squat party scene of recent years has seen an influx of European travellers, largely from the East, where there is also a large rave culture, for example events such as Czechtek.

Squat parties are typically either free or charge a small donation on the door. Typically the organisers also try to make additional money through selling alcohol inside.

Squat 'eviction' parties occur when the squatters residing in a building have been given a final date for their eviction, and as a final act of resistance organise a large scale party and protest in order to try to withstand the police or bailiffs.

Drugs

Drugs sale and use is long standing and accepted, most commonly MDMA (ecstasy), amphetamine, cocaine, LSD, psilocybin mushrooms, cannabis, nitrous oxide, and ketamine. Drugs are easily available at almost all free parties and people often use stimulants to reduce the fatigue resulting from dancing for many hours, as well as for the recreational effects. While psychedelics are often used to achieve altered states of consciousness, especially in psy trance festivals.

In early years MDMA was the most common drug taken at parties, however over the last ten years there has been a steady increase in the popularity of ketamine in Europe, most noticeably in the London scene, where ketamine has a massive presence. Since 2000 ketamine has crossed over from being almost entirely a drug found in the free party scene to one commonly found in mainstream clubs as well.

Security

Due to the drug culture and unregulated environment, security has become a problem for many party organisers. Some free party sound systems hire private security at events but security is only an issue in squat parties or very urban outdoor events. Outdoor parties have very little trouble.

Parties become autonomous zones, with self-policing and control being established by all attendance. If people make trouble calling the police is not an option so sometimes the music is stopped and the trouble makers are simply told by all the party goers to leave.

Locations

Typical parties in the London scene range from small parties with a couple of hundred people up to huge multi-riggers involving a thousand or more people. The number of sound systems involved also varies – small parties may have just one or two sound systems, larger parties may have anything up to 20 or more, including several "link-ups" where two or more sound systems will combine their rigs into a single large system.

Although London is the central location for squat parties, they exist outside the capital and places such as Three Counties Bedfordshire, Hertfordshire & Cambridgeshire also Buckinghamshire have popular scenes dating pre 1995. Modern parties are usually hosted in Bedford, Norfolk, or London; but Cambridgeshire, Northampton and Suffolk still have a contemporary underground scene, along with Derbyshire, South Yorkshire and South Wales. Outdoor parties are popular all over Wales and the South West and can attract up to a thousand people. Outdoor parties are organised so that noise pollution is not a factor. If the local residents complain then the party is much more at risk of being stopped. In most big cities there is an underground counterculture centred around free parties which are predominantly outdoor parties in the summer and squat parties when it is too cold. Most organisers will try to secure a warehouse, if not they will look for a wooded area to hide themselves and try and soften the music and enjoy the outdoor environment also to avoid being discovered by the authorities.

List of free parties

The following is an incomplete list of notable free parties:
Castlemorton Common Festival
Czechtek
KaZantip
Love Parade
Street Parade
Fuckparade
EggTek
UKtek
Tunnel vision by bustanut from Sheffield UK

See also
 Freetekno
 Teknival

References

Further reading

 
 St John, Graham. 2009. Technomad: Global Raving Countercultures (pp 36-64) . London: Equinox. .

External links

 Partyvibe Free party resource.
 How to Have a Free Party – SchNEWS DIY Guide
 Fantazia Free Party information – Reviews of Castlemorton etc.
 Squatjuice online bulletin board about the free party/ squatting culture.
 Survivors of Hardcore Belgium and Toronto hardcore & speedcore party organizers
 Dungeons Flyer Gallery Oldskool flyers
 fanat3k radio 
 

Counterculture festivals
DIY culture
Electronic music
Free parties
Musical subcultures